James Bloor may refer to:
 James Bloor (cricketer)
 James Bloor (actor)